Eggo Cereal is a breakfast cereal manufactured by Kellogg's.

History
In 2006, Kellogg's officially released Eggo Cereal. It came in two flavors: Maple Syrup and Cinnamon Toast. In commercials, they had used a character by the name of "The Eggo Man" to promote the cereal. The cereal was discontinued in 2012. 

In August 2019, the official Twitter page for Eggo posted a message on National Waffle Day saying that if their post got 10,000 retweets, they would officially bring the product back. By 6 September, the goal was reached, and in November Kellogg's brought back the Eggo cereal on the shelves of Walmart, with other local stores following in December. The new version came out with three flavors: Homestyle, Blueberry, and Chocolate. As of 2021, the Blueberry flavor has been discontinued.

Information
Eggo Cereal consists of maple syrup, cinnamon toast, and flavoured corn cereal pieces in a waffle shape, just like Eggo waffles. It was considered a multigrain cereal that is lightly sweetened to taste accordingly to the Eggo waffles that it was created after. It was produced to have a light buttery and maple taste to it. It was specifically shaped to resemble miniature Eggo waffles. An average serving size of this cereal was about one cup. For every serving of this cereal, there were 120 calories and 12 grams of sugar. Eggo Cereal contained allergens such as wheat, corn product, and soy beans. For a while they were being endorsed with Adidas by allowing the customers to receive a T-shirt by sending in 8 Get Up & Go tokens that could be found on the Eggo Cereal box. It is claimed that there is no actual maple syrup within the maple syrup Eggo cereal ingredients. The dietary exchanges labeled on the Eggo cereal are based on the Choose Your Foods Exchange Lists for Diabetes copyright 2008 by American Dietetic Association and American Diabetes Association.

References

External links 
 Official website (archived)

Kellogg's cereals
Products introduced in 2006